Blazing Ballads is a 1952 album by Dinah Washington, arranged by Jimmy Carroll, Nook Shrier and Ike Carpenter.

Track listing
"My Heart Cries for You" (Carl Sigman, Percy Faith)
"I Apologize" (Al Hoffman, Al Goodhart, Ed Nelson)
"I Won't Cry Any More" (Al Frisch, Fred Wise)
"Don't Say You're Sorry Again" (Lee Pearl, Art Berman, Eugene West)
"Mixed Emotions" (Stuart F. Louchheim)
"Cold, Cold Heart" (Hank Williams)
"Baby, Did You Hear?"
"Just One More Chance" (Arthur Johnston, Sam Coslow)

Personnel

 Dinah Washington - vocals on all tracks.

Tracks 1 to 4 
 Orchestra with Strings conducted by Jimmy Carroll

Tracks 5 to 7 

  Orchestra conducted by Nook Shrier, including:
 Paul Quinichette - tenor saxophone
 Wynton Kelly - piano
 Gus Johnson - drums

Track 8 

  Orchestra conducted by Ike Carpenter, including:
 Clyde Reasinger - trumpet
 Tom Reeves - trumpet
 Art Pearlman, Roger White - trombone
 Ed Freeman, alto saxophone
 Bob Hardaway, Bob Robinson - tenor saxophone
 Joe Koch - baritone saxophone
 Wynton Kelly - piano
 Chuck Norris - guitar
 Joe O'Rear - bass
 Dick Stanton - drums

References 

Dinah Washington albums
1952 albums